Ramana is a village of Bhawana Tehsil in Punjab, Pakistan. It is located on Bhawana-Painsra road with a population of 4,000(approximately).

Chiniot District
Villages in Chiniot District